The Whitesail Range is a subrange of the Tahtsa Ranges, located north of Whitesail River in northern British Columbia, Canada.

References

Whitesail Range in the Canadian Mountain Encyclopedia

Hazelton Mountains